The 2014–15 Miami Heat season was the 27th season of the franchise in the National Basketball Association (NBA). For the first time since 2010, LeBron James was not on the roster as he returned to the Cleveland Cavaliers. The Heat entered the 2014–15 season as the four-time defending Eastern Conference champion without LeBron, and were coming off of an NBA Finals loss in five games to the San Antonio Spurs. Although they remained in playoff contention until early April, the Heat were eliminated from playoff contention after their game 80 loss to the Toronto Raptors. The Heat failed to make the playoffs for the first time since 2008 after a four-year trip to the Finals, winning two in 2012 and 2013, and the first team since the 2004–05 Los Angeles Lakers and last until the 2018–19 Cleveland Cavaliers to fail to make the playoffs after making it to the NBA Finals from the previous season as well the first since the 2004–05 Lakers and last until the 2018–19 Cavaliers to miss the playoffs after losing the previous year's Finals.

For the first time since 1995–96, Ray Allen was not in the NBA as he sat out this season as a free agent and retired in 2016. Allen played with the Heat for 2 seasons where he helped them win a championship in 2013, his second ring after winning one in 2008 with the Boston Celtics.

Preseason

Draft picks

Regular season

Standings

Game log

Preseason

|- style="background:#fcc;"
| 1
| October 4
| New Orleans
| 
| James Ennis (17)
| Bosh, Jones, Ennis (6)
| Danny Granger (4)
| KFC Yum! Center20,074
| 0-1
|- style="background:#fcc;"
| 2
| October 7
| Orlando
| 
| Bosh, Deng (18)
| James Ennis (10)
| Norris Cole (6)
| American Airlines Arena19,600
| 0-2
|- style="background:#fcc;"
| 3
| October 11
| Cleveland
| 
| Chris Bosh (19)
| Chris Bosh (8)
| Wade, Napier (7)
| HSBC Arena15,411
| 0-3
|- style="background:#fcc;"
| 4
| October 14
| Atlanta
| 
| Chris Bosh (22)
| Chris Bosh (9)
| Dwyane Wade (5)
| American Airlines Arena19,600
| 0-4
|- style="background:#cfc;"
| 5
| October 17
| Golden State
| 
| Chris Bosh (21)
| Bosh, Williams (7)
| Wade, Deng (3)
| Sprint Center12,783
| 1-4
|- style="background:#cfc;"
| 6
| October 18
| @ San Antonio
| 
| Shabazz Napier (25)
| Khem Birch (13)
| Shabazz Napier (4)
| AT&T Center18,581
| 2-4
|- style="background:#cfc;"
| 7
| October 21
| Houston
| 
| Dwyane Wade (26)
| Chris Andersen (7)
| Dwyane Wade (6)
| American Airlines Arena19,600
| 3-4
|- style="background:#cfc;"
| 8
| October 24
| @ Memphis
| 
| Chris Bosh (21)
| Bosh, Birch (6)
| Norris Cole (7)
| FedEx Forum10,843
| 4-4

Regular season

|- style="background:#cfc;"
| 1
| October 29
| Washington
| 
| Chris Bosh (26)
| Chris Bosh (15)
| Bosh & Chalmers (4)
| American Airlines Arena19,744
| 1–0

|- style="background:#cfc;"
| 2
| November 1
| @ Philadelphia
| 
| Chris Bosh (30)
| Chris Bosh (8)
| Dwyane Wade (10)
| Wells Fargo Center19,753
| 2–0
|- style="background:#cfc;"
| 3
| November 2
| Toronto
| 
| Chris Bosh (21)
| Bosh & Wade (11)
| Dwyane Wade (7)
| American Airlines Arena19,666
| 3–0
|- style="background:#fcc;"
| 4
| November 4
| Houston
| 
| Chris Bosh (21)
| Chris Bosh (8)
| Shabazz Napier (4)
| American Airlines Arena19,666
| 3–1
|- style="background:#fcc;"
| 5
| November 5
| @ Charlotte
| 
| Dwyane Wade (25)
| Chris Bosh (13)
| Dwyane Wade (7)
| Time Warner Cable Arena15,874
| 3–2
|- style="background:#cfc;"
| 6
| November 8
| Minnesota
| 
| Dwyane Wade (25)
| Bosh & Williams (7)
| Dwyane Wade (8)
| American Airlines Arena19,735
| 4–2
|- style="background:#cfc;"
| 7
| November 9
| @ Dallas
| 
| Luol Deng (30)
| Chris Bosh (10)
| Dwyane Wade (10)
| American Airlines Center20,195
| 5–2
|- style="background:#fcc;"
| 8
| November 12
| Indiana
| 
| Dwyane Wade (20)
| Luol Deng (7)
| Norris Cole (7)
| American Airlines Arena19,658
| 5–3
|- style="background:#fcc;"
| 9
| November 14
| @ Atlanta
| 
| Mario Chalmers (23)
| Chris Bosh (8)
| Mario Chalmers (11)
| Philips Arena17,090
| 5–4
|- style="background:#fcc;"
| 10
| November 16
| Milwaukee
| 
| Mario Chalmers (18)
| Shawne Williams (11)
| Bosh & Chalmers (5)
| American Airlines Arena19,680
| 5–5
|- style="background:#cfc;"
| 11
| November 17
| @ Brooklyn
| 
| Mario Chalmers (22)
| Chris Bosh (9)
| Mario Chalmers (5)
| Barclays Center17,732
| 6–5
|- style="background:#fcc;"
| 12
| November 20
| L.A. Clippers
| 
| Chris Bosh (28)
| Chris Bosh (7)
| Chalmers & Napier (3)
| American Airlines Arena19,685
| 6–6
|- style="background:#cfc;"
| 13
| November 22
| @ Orlando
| 
| Chris Bosh (32)
| Chris Bosh (10)
| Mario Chalmers (8)
| Amway Center18,846
| 7–6
|- style="background:#cfc;"
| 14
| November 23
| Charlotte
| 
| Luol Deng (26)
| Chris Bosh (10)
| Mario Chalmers (10)
| American Airlines Arena19,639
| 8–6
|- style="background:#fcc;"
| 15
| November 25
| Golden State
| 
| Chris Bosh (26)
| Chris Bosh (9)
| Chalmers & Ennis (4)
| American Airlines Arena19,647
| 8–7
|- style="background:#cfc;"
| 16
| November 30
| @ New York
| 
| Dwyane Wade (27)
| Luol Deng (10)
| Dwyane Wade (5)
| Madison Square Garden19,812
| 9–7

|- style="background:#fcc;"
| 17
| December 1
| @ Washington
| 
| Chris Bosh (21)
| Chris Bosh (8)
| Josh McRoberts (4)
| Verizon Center15,150
| 9–8
|- style="background:#fcc;"
| 18
| December 3
| Atlanta
| 
| Dwyane Wade (28)
| Chris Bosh (11)
| Mario Chalmers (11)
| American Airlines Arena19,600
| 9–9
|- style="background:#fcc;"
| 19
| December 5
| @ Milwaukee
| 
| Dwyane Wade (28)
| Chris Bosh (6)
| Dwyane Wade (8)
| BMO Harris Bradley Center16,325
| 9–10
|- style="background:#fcc;"
| 20
| December 7
| @ Memphis
| 
| Dwyane Wade (25)
| Udonis Haslem (8)
| Dwyane Wade (6)
| FedExForum16,572
| 9–11
|- style="background:#cfc;"
| 21
| December 9
| @ Phoenix
| 
| Chris Bosh (34)
| Chris Bosh (9)
| Josh McRoberts (7)
| US Airways Center14,963
| 10–11
|- style="background:#fcc;"
| 22
| December 10
| @ Denver
| 
| Chris Bosh (14)
| Norris Cole (8)
| Norris Cole (8)
| Pepsi Center13,433
| 10–12
|- style="background:#cfc;"
| 23
| December 12
| @ Utah
| 
| Dwyane Wade (29)
| Chris Bosh (9)
| Dwyane Wade (7)
| EnergySolutions Arena19,911
| 11–12
|- style="background:#fcc;"
| 24
| December 14
| Chicago
| 
| Deng & Wade (17)
| Luol Deng (10)
| Norris Cole (6)
| American Airlines Arena19,600
| 11–13
|- style="background:#cfc;"
| 25
| December 16
| @ Brooklyn
| 
| Dwyane Wade (28)
| Chris Andersen (9)
| Mario Chalmers (5)
| Barclays Center16,827
| 12–13
|- style="background:#fcc;"
| 26
| December 17
| Utah
| 
| Dwyane Wade (42)
| Chris Andersen (9)
| Dwyane Wade (3)
| American Airlines Arena19,633
| 12–14
|- style="background:#fcc;"
| 27
| December 19
| Washington
| 
| Dwyane Wade (28)
| Hassan Whiteside (7)
| Dwyane Wade (8)
| American Airlines Arena19,600
| 12–15
|- style="background:#cfc;"
| 28
| December 21
| Boston
| 
| Luol Deng (23)
| James Ennis (8)
| Mario Chalmers (10)
| American Airlines Arena19,720
| 13–15
|- style="background:#fcc;"
| 29
| December 23
| Philadelphia
| 
| Dwyane Wade (23)
| Udonis Haslem (8)
| Dwyane Wade (6)
| American Airlines Arena19,600
| 13–16
|- style="background:#cfc;"
| 30
| December 25
| Cleveland
| 
| Dwyane Wade (31)
| Deng & Andersen (8)
| Luol Deng (8)
| American Airlines Arena19,817
| 14–16
|- style="background:#fcc;"
| 31
| December 27
| Memphis
| 
| Dwyane Wade (25)
| Hassan Whiteside (7)
| Dwyane Wade (7)
| American Airlines Arena19,744
| 14–17
|- style="background:#fcc;"
| 32
| December 29
| Orlando
| 
| Dwyane Wade (25)
| Chris Bosh (8)
| Dwyane Wade (6)
| American Airlines Arena19,887
| 14–18
|- style="background:#fcc;"
| 33
| December 31
| @ Indiana
| 
| Dwyane Wade (20)
| Chris Bosh (8)
| Dwyane Wade (7)
| Bankers Life Fieldhouse18,165
| 14–19

|- style="background:#fcc;"
| 34
| January 3
| @ Houston
| 
| Bosh & Wade (15)
| Deng & Whiteside (6)
| Mario Chalmers (5)
| Toyota Center18,338
| 14–20
|- style="background:#cfc;"
| 35
| January 4
| Brooklyn
| 
| Chris Bosh (26)
| Hassan Whiteside (10)
| Dwyane Wade (7)
| American Airlines Arena20,181
| 15–20
|- style="background:#fcc;"
| 36
| January 8
| @ Portland
| 
| Dwyane Wade (23)
| Hassan Whiteside (8)
| Chris Bosh (5)
| Moda Center19,441
| 15–21
|- style="background:#cfc;"
| 37
| January 11
| @ L.A. Clippers
| 
| Chris Bosh (34)
| Hassan Whiteside (16)
| Dwyane Wade (10)
| Staples Center19,060
| 16–21
|- style="background:#cfc;"
| 38
| January 13
| @ L.A. Lakers
| 
| Mario Chalmers (19)
| Hassan Whiteside (9)
| Mario Chalmers (8)
| Staples Center18,997
| 17–21
|- style="background:#fcc;"
| 39
| January 14
| @ Golden State
| 
| Chris Bosh (26)
| Hassan Whiteside (12)
| Shabazz Napier (6)
| Oracle Arena19,596
| 17–22
|- style="background:#cfc;"
| 40
| January 16
| @ Sacramento
| 
| Chris Bosh (30)
| Chris Bosh (7)
| Shabazz Napier (5)
| Sleep Train Arena16,350
| 18–22
|- style="background:#fcc;"
| 41
| January 20
| Oklahoma City
| 
| Dwyane Wade (18)
| Chris Bosh (7)
| Dwyane Wade (6)
| American Airlines Arena19,735
| 18–23
|- style="background:#fcc;"
| 42
| January 21
| @ Charlotte
| 
| Bosh & Wade (17)
| Bosh & Wade & Napier (5)
| Wade & Napier (4)
| Time Warner Cable Arena16,914
| 18–24
|- style="background:#cfc;"
| 43
| January 23
| Indiana
| 
| Luol Deng (23)
| Chris Andersen (13)
| Dwyane Wade (4)
| American Airlines Arena19,693
| 19–24
|- style="background:#cfc;"
| 44
| January 25
| @ Chicago
| 
| Dwyane Wade (26)
| Hassan Whiteside (13)
| Mario Chalmers (5)
| United Center21,918
| 20–24
|- style="background:#fcc;"
| 45
| January 27
| Milwaukee
| 
| Chris Bosh (26)
| Hassan Whiteside (16)
| Mario Chalmers (8)
| American Airlines Arena21,918
| 20–25
|- style="background:#fcc;"
| 46
| January 30
| Dallas
| 
| Hassan Whiteside (16)
| Hassan Whiteside (24)
| Mario Chalmers (6)
| American Airlines Arena19,823
| 20–26

|- style="background:#cfc;"
| 47
| February 1
| @ Boston
| 
| Hassan Whiteside (20)
| Whiteside & Johnson (9)
| Cole & Johnson (4) 
| TD Garden19,823
| 21–26
|- style="background:#fcc;"
| 48
| February 3
| @ Detroit
| 
| Chris Bosh (34)
| Hassan Whiteside (10)
| Norris Cole (8)
| Palace of Auburn Hills12,768
| 21–27
|- style="background:#fcc;"
| 49
| February 4
| @ Minnesota
| 
| Hassan Whiteside (24)
| Hassan Whiteside (20)
| Shabazz Napier (7)
| Target Center12,768
| 21–28
|- style="background:#fcc;"
| 50
| February 6
| @ San Antonio
| 
| Tyler Johnson (18)
| James Ennis (8)
| Cole & Napier (5)
| AT&T Center18,581
| 21–29
|- style="background:#cfc;"
| 51
| February 9
| New York
| 
| Chris Bosh (32)
| Hassan Whiteside (9)
| Norris Cole (8)
| American Airlines Arena19,851
| 22–29
|- style="background:#fcc;"
| 52
| February 11
| @ Cleveland
| 
| Mario Chalmers (18)
| Hassan Whiteside (14)
| Shabazz Napier (8)
| Quicken Loans Arena20,562
| 22–30
|- align="center"
|colspan="9" bgcolor="#bbcaff"|All-Star Break
|- style="background:#cfc;"
| 53
| February 20
| @ New York
| 
| Shabazz Napier (18)
| Hassan Whiteside (14)
| Luol Deng (8)
| Madison Square Garden19,812
| 23–30
|- style="background:#fcc;"
| 54
| February 21
| New Orleans
| 
| Mario Chalmers (20)
| Hassan Whiteside (16)
| Wade & Andersen (4)
| American Airlines Arena19,982
| 23–31
|- style="background:#cfc;"
| 55
| February 23
| Philadelphia
| 
| Luol Deng (29)
| Hassan Whiteside (14)
| Goran Dragić (10)
| American Airlines Arena19,802
| 24–31
|- style="background:#cfc;"
| 56
| February 25
| @ Orlando
| 
| Luol Deng (21)
| Hassan Whiteside (13)
| Dwyane Wade (6)
| Amway Center18,309
| 25–31
|- style="background:#fcc;"
| 57
| February 27
| @ New Orleans
| 
| Luol Deng (22)
| Hassan Whiteside (7)
| Dwyane Wade (8)
| Smoothie King Center17,797
| 25–32
|- style="background:#fcc;"
| 58
| February 28
| Atlanta
| 
| Dwyane Wade (22)
| Hassan Whiteside (24)
| Goran Dragić (6)
| American Airlines Arena19,733
| 25–33

|- style="background:#cfc;"
| 59
| March 2
| Phoenix
| 
| Tyler Johnson (26)
| Hassan Whiteside (10)
| Dwyane Wade (9)
| American Airlines Arena19,600
| 26–33
|- style="background:#cfc;"
| 60
| March 4
| L.A. Lakers
| 
| Dwyane Wade (25)
| Hassan Whiteside (25)
| Dragić & Wade (6)
| American Airlines Arena19,600
| 27–33
|- style="background:#fcc;"
| 61
| March 6
| @ Washington
| 
| Goran Dragić (18)
| Chris Andersen (6)
| Goran Dragić (7)
| Verizon Center20,356
| 27–34
|- style="background:#cfc;"
| 62
| March 7
| Sacramento
| 
| Dwyane Wade (28)
| Michael Beasley (7)
| Mario Chalmers (7)
| American Airlines Arena19,600
| 28-34
|- style="background:#fcc;"
| 63
| March 9
| Boston
| 
| Dwyane Wade (34)
| Hassan Whiteside (9)
| Chalmers & Deng (4)
| American Airlines Arena19,600
| 28–35
|- style="background:#cfc;"
| 64
| March 11
| Brooklyn
| 
| Dwyane Wade (28)
| Chris Andersen (14)
| Dwyane Wade (9)
| American Airlines Arena19,600
| 29–35
|- style="background:#fcc;"
| 65
| March 13
| @ Toronto
| 
| Dwyane Wade (25)
| Hassan Whiteside (5)
| Goran Dragić (5)
| Air Canada Centre19,800
| 29–36
|- style="background:#cfc;"
| 66
| March 16
| Cleveland
| 
| Dwyane Wade (32)
| Hassan Whiteside (11)
| Goran Dragić (9)
| American Airlines Arena19,626
| 30–36
|- style="background:#cfc;"
| 67
| March 18
| Portland
| 
| Dwyane Wade (32)
| Hassan Whiteside (10)
| Goran Dragić (11) 
| American Airlines Arena19,621
| 31–36
|- style="background:#cfc;"
| 68
| March 20
| Denver
| 
| Dwyane Wade (22)
| Hassan Whiteside (10)
| Michael Beasley (7)
| American Airlines Arena19,710
| 32–36
|- style="background:#fcc;"
| 69
| March 22
| @ Oklahoma City
| 
| Hassan Whiteside (13)
| Udonis Haslem (7)
| Dwyane Wade (4)
| Chesapeake Energy Arena18,203
| 32–37
|- style="background:#fcc;"
| 70
| March 24
| @ Milwaukee
| 
| Dwyane Wade (21)
| Hassan Whiteside (8)
| Goran Dragić (6)
| BMO Harris Bradley Center12,313
| 32–38
|- style="background:#cfc;"
| 71
| March 25
| @ Boston
| 
| Goran Dragić (22)
| Udonis Haslem (12)
| Chalmers & Dragić (7)
| TD Garden18,624
| 33–38
|- style="background:#fcc;"
| 72
| March 27
| @ Atlanta
| 
| Luol Deng (17)
| Luol Deng (10)
| Chalmers & Walker (5)
| Philips Arena19,233
| 33–39
|- style="background:#cfc;"
| 73
| March 29
| Detroit
| 
| Dwyane Wade (40)
| Udonis Haslem (13)
| Goran Dragić (5)
| American Airlines Arena19,685
| 34–39
|- style="background:#fcc;"
| 74
| March 31
| San Antonio
| 
| Goran Dragić (19)
| Chris Andersen (10)
| Chalmers & Dragić (3)
| American Airlines Arena20,047
| 34–40

|- style="background:#fcc;"
| 75
| April 2
| @ Cleveland
| 
| Deng & Whiteside (17)
| Deng & Whiteside (8)
| Goran Dragić (7)
| Quicken Loans Arena20,562
| 34–41
|- style="background:#fcc;"
| 76
| April 4
| @ Detroit
| 
| Dwyane Wade (24)
| Hassan Whiteside (12)
| Goran Dragić (7) 
| Palace of Auburn Hills16,133
| 34–42
|- style="background:#fcc;"
| 77
| April 5
| @ Indiana
| 
| Dwyane Wade (27)
| Udonis Haslem (10)
| Goran Dragić (5)
| Bankers Life Fieldhouse18,165
| 34–43
|- style="background:#cfc;"
| 78
| April 7
| Charlotte
| 
| Goran Dragić (28)
| Haslem & Whiteside (8)
| Dragić & Wade (5)
| American Airlines Arena19,694
| 35–43
|- style="background:#fcc;"
| 79
| April 9
| Chicago
| 
| Dwyane Wade (19)
| Hassan Whiteside (16)
| Luol Deng (4)
| American Airlines Arena19,641
| 35–44
|- style="background:#fcc;"
| 80
| April 11
| Toronto
| 
| Dwyane Wade (30)
| Hassan Whiteside (18)
| Wade & Dragić (5)
| American Airlines Arena19,689
| 35–45
|- style="background:#cfc;"
| 81
| April 13
| Orlando
| 
| Hassan Whiteside (24)
| Hassan Whiteside (13)
| Goran Dragic (8)
| American Airlines Arena19,600
| 36–45
|- style="background:#cfc;"
| 82
| April 15
| @ Philadelphia
| 
| Michael Beasley (34)
| James Ennis (12)
| James Ennis (6)
| Wells Fargo Center14,476
| 37–45

Player statistics

Summer League

|-
|}

Preseason

|-
|}

Regular season

|-
|}

Injuries

Josh McRoberts

Chris Bosh

Shabazz Napier

Roster

Transactions

Trades

Free agents

Re-signed

Additions

Subtractions
LeBron James Cleveland Cavaliers

Awards

References

External links
2014–15 Miami Heat preseason at ESPN
2014–15 Miami Heat regular season at ESPN

Miami Heat seasons
Miami Heat
Miami Heat
Miami Heat